The Legislative Council Complex (LegCo Complex) is the headquarters of the Legislative Council of Hong Kong. The complex is located at 1 Legislative Council Road, Central, Hong Kong.

Construction of the LegCo Complex commenced in 2008 and was completed in 2011. It was the first purpose-built building for the Hong Kong legislature.

It forms part of the Central Government Complex.

On 1 July 2019, the building was stormed and briefly occupied by protesters in the 2019–20 Hong Kong protests.

History

Previous homes of the Legislative Council
Before 2011, the Legislative Council met at other locations:

 Former French Mission Building 1843–1846
 Caine Road 1846–1855
 Government House, Hong Kong 1855; used ballroom after 1891
 Old Central Government Offices 1930s until 1954
 Former Central Government Offices 1957–1985
 Old Supreme Court Building 1985–2011

2019 anti-extradition bill protests

As part of protests against the 2019 Hong Kong extradition bill on 1 July 2019, a smaller, more-radical group of protesters from the day's march against the central government, angered by the previous crackdowns of peaceful protests by the police and from the lack of a total withdrawal of the bill, gathered around the Legislative Council Complex and, after the police withdrew from the site, stormed the building, using improvised battering rams to break through the glass into the lobby of the building. The protesters gained entrance to the Legislative Council chambers and defaced the walls and symbols of the council with graffiti, some calling out against the SAR and mainland governments, and some against the Hong Kong Police Force. The police regained control of the Legco site by midnight, where by then, most protesters had left the site peacefully. The estimated cost of the damage to the site was HK$10 million, though protesters took care not to damage historical artefacts or the libraries.

Planned expansion
In an effort to cement control over the legislature by the pro-Beijing camp, China reformed Hong Kong's electoral system in 2021, reducing the number of LegCo seats elected by the public, and adding 40 more seats to be elected by a small-circle Election Committee. As a result of these reforms, LegCo will increase from 70 to 90 members. On 10 May 2021, lawmakers approved a government plan to expand the LegCo complex accordingly. Under the proposal the building will be expanded by three storeys.

Design
The Complex sits on the reclaimed Tamar site, facing Victoria Harbour. Before completion of the complex, the Former Supreme Court Building was used to house the Legislative Council.

The LegCo Complex is composed of the Council Block and the Office Block. Adjoining the Complex are LegCo Garden and LegCo Square. The Complex provides office and conference facilities for staff, visitors, and members of the press.

Architecture
The LegCo Complex demonstrates a strong emphasis on the vertical lines and features as the integrative design element. The interior design theme of the LegCo Complex integrates both elements of solemnity and prudence, and of openness and empathy, as symbolically represented by "square" (which denotes restraints) and "round" (which denotes changes) shapes used strategically in the interior design of the various lobby halls and conference rooms.

Green features
-A natural light funnel at the chamber

-Green roof and sky garden

-Lilypond

-Double-layered ventilated facade design

Barrier free designs
-Automatic sliding or swing doors and tactile paths are installed in all main entrances and areas

-Unobstructed space is provided for internal doors at public areas and common areas

-Disabled toilets are available on every floor.

-Some toilet cubicles are enlarged for easy maneuvers of people with physical disabilities.

-Wireless microphone and earphone are installed in some meeting rooms.

-Audio sign systems or touch-activated audio signs are installed at key locations accessible by the public for people with visual impairment.

Art
Artworks can be found all over the place, enhancing the place's environment.

Facilities

Conference facilities
Council meetings are held in 800 square metre The Chamber. There are also five conference rooms for members to hold open and closed committee meetings.

Public and press galleries are located at the upper level of the Chamber together with three conference rooms for the public and the press to observe proceedings of all Council meetings and open meetings of committees. All seats of the public and press galleries are equipped with headphones for simultaneous interpretation between Cantonese and English.

Media facilities
Media facilities for reporters to cover meetings and activities of the Council include a duplex press room, dedicated TV/radio rooms for electronic news media organisations, and larger photo rooms for photographers and camera crews.

Public facilities
The LegCo Complex incorporates a number of facilities open for visit by the public including a library, an archive, a series of education facilities such as a children's corner, a memory lane, a viewing gallery, an education activities room, and two education galleries.

See also
 Central Government Complex
 Macau Legislative Assembly Building

References

External links

 Tamar Development Project
 Pictures of inside the Legislative Council Complex

Legislative buildings
Central, Hong Kong
Government buildings in Hong Kong
International Style (architecture)
Postmodern architecture